Katrina Groth (born 1982) is an American mechanical engineer and professor. Groth is an Associate Professor in Mechanical Engineering at the University of Maryland, College Park, where she is the associate director for research for the Center for Risk and Reliability and the director of the Systems Risk and Reliability Analysis lab (SyRRA). Groth previously served as the Principal Research & Development Engineer at Sandia National Laboratories.

Biography
Groth received her Bachelor of Science in Nuclear Engineering from the University of Maryland in 2004. She received a Master of Science in Reliability Engineering in 2008 and a Ph.D. in Reliability Engineering in 2008 and 2009, respectively, both from the University of Maryland.

From 2009 to 2017, Groth worked for the Sandia National Laboratories. While working at Sandia, Groth developed Hydrogen Plus Other Alternative Fuels Risk Assessment Models (HyRAM+), a software toolkit integrating publicly available hydrogen storage data and models. HyRAM+ was used to develop both the American and international safety standards for hydrogen fueling stations—NFPA 2 and ISO 19880-1.

In 2017, Groth joined the University of Maryland's School of Engineering. There, Groth is the associate director of the Center for Risk & Reliability. Groth is also the director of the Systems Risk & Reliability Analysis (SyRRA) laboratory.

In 2021, Groth received the NSF CAREER award for Modernizing Risk Assessment Through Systematic Integration of Probabilistic Risk Assessment (PRA) and Prognostics and Health Management (PHM).

Groth serves on the board of the National Museum of Nuclear Science & History.

Honors and awards
 Landis Young Member Engineering Achievement Award, American Nuclear Society, 2022
 CAREER  Award, National Science Foundation, 2021
 David Okrent Award for Nuclear Safety, American Nuclear Society, 2021
 United States Department of Energy Hydrogen Program Safety, Codes, and Standards Award, 2016
 Robert Schefer Memorial Best Paper Award, 2015

Notable works 
  A data-informed PIF hierarchy for model-based Human Reliability Analysis
  Bridging the gap between HRA research and HRA practice: A Bayesian network version of SPAR-H
  Deriving causal Bayesian networks from human reliability analysis data: A methodology and example model
  HyRAM: A methodology and toolkit for quantitative risk assessment of hydrogen systems
 Hydrogen storage and delivery: Review of the state of the art technologies and risk and reliability analysis

References

External links 
 UMD faculty profile
 SyRRA Lab
 Google Scholar

University of Maryland, College Park faculty
1982 births
Living people
American scientists
University of Maryland, College Park alumni